Kearney is a global management consulting firm with offices in more than 40 countries worldwide. Kearney's predecessor firm was founded in Chicago by James O. McKinsey in 1926; he hired Andrew Thomas "Tom" Kearney as his first partner in 1929. After James McKinsey died in 1937, the Chicago office split into its own company, led by Tom Kearney and called McKinsey, A.T. Kearney, and Company. In 1947, it was renamed A.T. Kearney and Company.

In January 2020, the firm underwent a major rebranding and changed its name from A.T. Kearney to Kearney.

Practice areas
Kearney has offices in 40 countries and has more than 3,600 employees. It operates under a unique "one-partner, one-vote" structure, by which each of the company's 300+ partners has an equal vote on governance matters.  

Kearney covers a wide range of industries and capabilities. Industry specialties include aerospace and defense, automotive, chemicals, communications media and technology, consumer products and retail, financial institutions, healthcare, metals and mining, oil and gas, private equity, public sector, transportation, and infrastructure and utilities. Major service lines are in strategy, analytics, mergers and acquisitions, innovation, operations, technology strategy, organization and transformation, marketing and sales, procurement, and sustainability. The firm is particularly well known for its operations, supply chain and transformation expertise, ranking among the top firms in these areas.

Kearney is a longstanding partner of the World Economic Forum, attending Forum events and advising on global platforms and regional agendas and serving as a member of the Alliance of CEO Climate Members, and Racial Justice in Business. Kearney began its relationship with the European Management Forum in 1971, and it became an institutional partner in 1997.

History
In 1926, James O. McKinsey founded his eponymous firm of "accountants and management engineers"; three years later he hired Tom Kearney as the first partner at McKinsey & Company. Upon McKinsey's sudden death in 1937, the remaining partners disagreed on how to best run the firm and by 1939, they had split into three organizations: Scovell, Wellington & Company, the accounting practice run by Oliver Wellington that McKinsey & Company had purchased before McKinsey's death; McKinsey, A.T. Kearney & Company, the Chicago consulting office run by Tom Kearney; and McKinsey & Company, run by Marvin Bower. In 1947, when Bower purchased the rights to the McKinsey name from Kearney, Tom renamed the firm after himself, creating A.T. Kearney and Company. In 1972, the name was shortened to A.T. Kearney.

A.T. Kearney opened its first international office in Düsseldorf, Germany in 1964. Its first office in Asia was opened in 1972, in Tokyo, Japan.

Kearney established its Global Business Policy Council in 1992. The Council is a specialized foresight and strategic analysis unit that conducts research and analysis. It regularly ranks near the top of the University of Pennsylvania's list of best for-profit private-sector think tanks; it was ranked fourth globally in 2020. The Council also hosts and an annual CEO Retreat, whose attendees include prominent academic, corporate, and government thought leaders. Membership is by invitation only, and current members may veto the invitation of competitors.

In 1995, A.T. Kearney was acquired by the American information technology company EDS for $569 million. The purchase of a successful management consultancy by an IT services group was unprecedented, but initially financially successful, with Kearney's revenue tripling in five years to reach an industry-leading $1.3 billion by 2000. However, the firms experienced some culture clash: the Financial Times later described a clash between "A.T. Kearney's individualistic, entrepreneurial style and the more bureaucratic approach of EDS." These tensions peaked when the dotcom bubble burst, impacting both companies results. EDS eventually shed hundreds of jobs at A.T. Kearney, reduced compensation, consolidated back-office functions, and eventually relocated A.T. Kearney's headquarters from Chicago to Plano, Texas. By mid-2005, A.T. Kearney had experienced 11 straight quarters of shrinking revenues, including being unprofitable the final three quarters. In 2006, A.T. Kearney CEO Henner Klein and the consultancy's management struck a deal with EDS CEO Michael Jordan to buy the firm back, and A.T. Kearney was once again an independent firm.

In 2019, Kearney acquired Cervello, a business analytics and data management consultancy that had offices in Boston, Dallas, New York, London and Bangalore. Cervello's focus areas include enterprise performance management, data management, business intelligence and CRM.

References

External links 
Official site

1926 establishments in Illinois
Consulting firms established in 1926
International management consulting firms
Companies based in Chicago
Privately held companies based in Illinois
Management consulting firms of the United States